Deepak Wadhwa is an Indian actor. He has performed many roles in various Hindi television shows, like Dhoondh Legi Manzil Humein, Kaali- Ek Punar Avtaar, Ishq Kills, Qubool Hai, Tamanna, Code Red and Haasil. As of July 2017, he has done his most recent role in Yeh Hai Mohabbatein. He has also appeared in a cameo in Calendar Girls. He is known for playing lead role of Sanjay in Star Plus sports-drama Meri Tamanna and Rahaat in Zee TV's Qubool Hai.

Television
STAR Plus' Yeh Hai Mohabbatein as Gaurav Bajaj
STAR One's Dhoondh Legi Manzil Humein
STAR Plus's Ishq Kills & Kaali – Ek Punar Avatar
STAR Plus' Teri Meri Love Stories as Sunil Gupta 
Zee TV's Qubool Hai as Major Rahat Ansari 
Colors TV's Code Red
Sony TV's Aahat (season 6)
Sony TV's Haasil as David
Zing's Pyaar Tune Kya Kiya (season 5) as Deepak
Star Plus's Tamanna as Sanjay Pratap Singh
&tv's Gangaa as Rudra
MTV's Webbed
Colors TV's Naagin 3 as Mohit Sippi
Sony TV's Vighnaharta Ganesh as Raktabeej 
Sony TV's Kuch Rang Pyar Ke Aise Bhi as Jatin

Film
Calendar Girls as Inzamam

References

External links

21st-century Indian male actors
1987 births
Punjabi people
Indian male models
Indian male television actors
Indian male film actors
Male actors in Hindi television
Male actors in Hindi cinema
Male actors from Mumbai
Living people